The Daladavamsa is a lost Sinhala religious chronicle composed in Elu. It relates the story of the arrival of the Relic of the tooth of the Buddha in Sri Lanka and is said to have been composed shortly after its arrival in the 3rd century. It is the source text of the Dāṭhavaṃsa, a Pali text likely composed in the 13th century CE.

Under the title Datha-dhatu-vamsa, mentioned in the Culavamsa, it may have been extended by subsequent authors to cover the story of the Tooth Relic into the 18th century. George Turnour claimed that this Sinhala text still existed in the 19th century, which would have made it the earliest surviving Sri Lankan historical text, but no copies are known to exist and it is now considered to be lost.

References

History books about Sri Lanka
Pali Buddhist texts
Sri Lankan Buddhist texts
3rd-century history books
Sri Lankan chronicles
Lost religious texts